Erithosoma is a genus of mites in the family Parasitidae.

Species
 Erithosoma pilosum C. Athias-Henriot, 1979

References

Parasitidae